Svenja is a feminine given name used in German-speaking countries. Notable people with the first name Svenja are:

 Svenja Fölmli (born 2002), Swiss footballer
 Svenja Huth (born 1991), German footballer
 Svenja Weidemann (born 1980), German professional tennis player
 Svenja Pages (born 1966), German television actress

German feminine given names